Asur may refer to:

Asur (film), a 2020 Indian Bengali-language drama film
Asur (web series), a 2020 Indian Hindi-language web-series
Asur people, a Munda-speaking tribe of iron-smelters in Jharkhand
Asur, Thanjavur district, a village in the state of Tamil Nadu, India
Asur, Iran, a village in the Tehran Province of Iran
Romanian Secular-Humanist Association

See also
Asura
Ashur (disambiguation)